Korhonen is a surname originating in Finland, where it is the most common surname. The most common surname in Finland was Virtanen before 2009, when the number of people with the surname Korhonen exceeded the number of people with the surname Virtanen for the first time.

The word 'korho' is not used in modern standard Finnish, but in languages closely related to Finnish, such as Estonian and Ludic, it means "elevated". As an example of a verb derived from 'korho', in Karelian 'korhottaa' means "to be or move upright", "to have one's head up high", "to raise", "to shake threateningly", "to brandish", and "to listen attentively".

In modern Finnish 'korottaa' means "to raise" and 'kohottaa' means "to elevate", "to uplift", "to hold up", and "to leaven". 'Kohottaa' also means "to toast" when combined into 'kohottaa malja' ("to raise a goblet or a cup").

'Korho' has meant "proud", "rich", and "boastful" in the southern parts of Finnish Lapland, and in Satakunta and Pirkanmaa it has meant "large man".
In some dialects 'korho' has meant "hearing-impaired", and it seems that this meaning was most likely derived from the "to listen attentively"-meaning of the verb 'korhottaa'. In some places 'korho' has meant "slightly stupid", "inattentive", and "clumsy": it appears likely that these meanings were derived from the "hearing-impaired"-meaning.

Some dialectal nouns derived from 'korho' have been documented in Finland, such as 'korhopää' from Pöytyä meaning roughly "one with a head of upright hair" and 'korholaiho' from Ylistaro meaning "a crop of cereal growing upright".

The name originates from eastern Finland and is much older than its closest competitor for the title of the most common Finnish surname, Virtanen.

People with the surname
Aku Korhonen (1892−1960), Finnish actor
Erkki Korhonen (born 1956), Finnish director of opera, pianist
Gunnar Korhonen (1918–2001), Finnish economist, government minister
Janne Korhonen (taekwondo) (born 1970), Finnish taekwondoin
Janne Korhonen (football) (born 1979), Finnish footballer
Kari Korhonen (born 1973), Finnish cartoonist
Keijo Korhonen (politician) (born 1934), Finnish politician (foreign minister) and professor
Keijo Korhonen (ski jumper) (born 1956), Finnish ski jumper
Markus Korhonen (born 1975), Finnish ice hockey player
Martti Korhonen (born 1953), Finnish member of parliament
Paavo Korhonen (1928–2019), Finnish Nordic combined skier
Pekka Korhonen (born 1955), Finnish political scientist and professor
Pentti Korhonen (born 1951), Finnish motorcycle racer
 (born 1977), Finnish fashion designer
Urpo Korhonen (1923–2009), Finnish cross-country skier

References

Finnish-language surnames